Gianni Amelio (born 20 January 1945) is an Italian film director.

Early life
Amelio was born in San Pietro di Magisano, province of Catanzaro, Calabria. His father moved to Argentina soon after his birth. He spent his youth and adolescence with his mother and his grandmother. The absence of a paternal figures will be a constant in Amelio's future works.

During his university studies of philosophy in Messina, Amelio got interested in cinema, writing as film critic for a local magazine. In 1965 he moved to Rome, where he worked as operator and assistant director for figures such as Liliana Cavani and Vittorio De Seta. He also worked for television, directing documentaries and advertisements.

Amelio's first important work is the TV film La città del sole, directed in 1973 for RAI TV and inspired to Tommaso Campanella's work. This was followed by Bertolucci secondo il cinema (1976) a documentary about 1900 shooting, and the thriller Effetti speciali. Two years later he directed the mystery La morte al lavoro, which won prizes at Locarno and Hyères festivals. The Little Archimedes (Il piccolo Archimede) of 1979 was also critically acclaimed.

In 1982 he debuted for cinema proper with Blow to the Heart (Colpire al cuore), about Italian terrorism, presented at the Venice Film Festival. In 1987 Amelio released I ragazzi di via Panisperna, about the lives of 1930 Italian physicists such as Enrico Fermi and Edoardo Amaldi, which won the award for best screenplay at the Bari Film Festival. 1989's Open Doors (Porte aperte), featuring Gian Maria Volonté, confirmed Amelio's status as one of Italy's best film directors and won a nomination as Best Foreign Film at 1991 Academy Awards. The film received also four Felix, two Silver Ribbon, four David di Donatello and three Golden Globes awards.

Also successful was The Stolen Children (Il ladro di bambini) in 1992, which won the Special Prize of Jury at the 1992 Cannes Film Festival plus two Silver Ribbon and 5 David di Donatello. In 1994 Lamerica, about Albanian immigration in Italy, repeated the fate and the success, with 2 Silver Ribbons and 3 Davids. Four years later, The Way We Laughed (Così ridevano) won the Golden Lion at the Venice Film Festival. Amelio gained another Silver Ribbon as best director for The Keys to the House (Le chiavi di casa), inspired to a novel by Giuseppe Pontiggia, of 2004.

Amelio was a member of jury at the Cannes Film Festival in 1995. In 2006 he released his eighth feature film, The Missing Star (La stella che non c'è), featuring Sergio Castellitto. From 2009 to 2012 he has been director of Torino Film Festival, Turin.

Amelio came out as gay late in life, shortly before the release of his 2014 documentary Happy to be Different.

Filmography 
 La città del sole (1973, TV)
 Effetti speciali (1974, TV)
 Bertolucci secondo il cinema (1976, TV)
 La morte al lavoro (1978, TV)
 The Little Archimedes (1979, TV) 
 I velieri (1980, TV)
 Blow to the Heart (1982) 
 I ragazzi di via Panisperna (1987) 
 Open Doors (1989) 
 The Stolen Children (1992) 
 Lamerica (1994) 
 The Way We Laughed (1998) 
 The Keys to the House (2004) 
 The Missing Star (2006)
 The First Man (2011)
 L'intrepido (2013)
 Happy to Be Different (2014)
 Tenderness (2017)
 Hammamet (2020)
 The Lord of the Ants (2022)

Awards
Nastro d'Argento Best Director
Open Doors (1991)
The Stolen Children (1993)
Lamerica (1995)
The Keys to the House (2005)
Leone d'Oro at Venice Film Festival
The Way We Laughed (1998)
European Film Awards Best Film
Open Doors (1991)
The Stolen Children (1993)
Lamerica (1995)

References

Bibliography
 Academic article on Lamerica, See link: https://www.academia.edu/3379912/Inside_the_Beasts_Cage_Gianni_Amelios_Lamerica_and_the_Dilemmas_of_Post-1989_Leftist_Cinema
 Raccontare i sentimenti. Il Cinema di Gianni Amelio, a cura di Sebastiano Gesù, Giuseppe Maimone Editore, Catania 2008

External links

 GreenCine interviews Gianni Amelio, conducted by NPR's David D'Arcy

1945 births
Living people
People from Catanzaro
Italian film directors
LGBT film directors
Italian gay men
Directors of Golden Lion winners
Crystal Simorgh recipients
David di Donatello winners
Nastro d'Argento winners
Ciak d'oro winners